Oliver Schäfer (born 27 February 1969) is a German former professional footballer who played as a defender. After his retirement as a player, he has taken up several coaching roles.

Honours
1. FC Kaiserslautern
 DFL-Supercup: 1991
 Bundesliga: 1998; runners-up 1994
 DFB-Pokal: 1996

Beşiktaş
 Süper Lig runners-up: 2000

References

1969 births
Living people
Association football defenders
German footballers
German football managers
Freiburger FC players
SC Freiburg players
1. FC Kaiserslautern players
1. FC Kaiserslautern II players
Beşiktaş J.K. footballers
Hannover 96 players
1. FC Saarbrücken players
Bundesliga players
Süper Lig players
German expatriate footballers
German expatriate sportspeople in Turkey
Expatriate footballers in Turkey
People from Lahr
Sportspeople from Freiburg (region)
Footballers from Baden-Württemberg
Association football coaches
West German footballers